Claude Geffré (23 January 1926 – 9 February 2017) was a French Roman Catholic theologian. He became a Professor of Theology at the Institut Catholique de Paris in 1965, and he was the director of the École Biblique in Jerusalem from 1996 to 1999. He was an expert on Biblical hermeneutics and pluralism, and the author of several books.

Early life
Claude Geffré was born on 23 January 1926 in Niort, Western France. He earned a doctorate in theology from the Pontifical University of Saint Thomas Aquinas.

Career
Geffré started his teaching career at Saulchoir. In 1965, he became a professor of theology at the Institut Catholique de Paris. He served as the director of the École Biblique in Jerusalem from 1996 to 1999.

Geffré was an expert in Biblical hermeneutics and pluralism. In 1977, he was the co-founder of the Groupe de recherches islamo-chrétien (GRIC), a research centre for Christian-Muslim Studies. He was the author of several books about Christianity. Some of his books, like Le christianisme comme religion de l'Evangile, were dismissed as "relativistic" by some critics.

Geffré became a Knight of the Legion of Honour in 1998.

Death
Geffré died on 9 February 2017 in Paris, at the age of 91. His funeral will be held at the Couvent des Jacobins de la rue Saint-Jacques on 13 February 2017 and he will be buried in Étiolles, Essonne, France.

Works

References

1926 births
2017 deaths
People from Niort
Pontifical University of Saint Thomas Aquinas alumni
French Roman Catholic writers
Academic staff of the Institut Catholique de Paris
French Dominicans
Knights of the Ordre national du Mérite
Chevaliers of the Légion d'honneur